is a Japanese actor and singer who was affiliated with Sony Music Artists and graduated from Kyushugakuin High School. He played the role of Ian Yorkland (Kyoryu Black) in the 2013 Super Sentai TV series Zyuden Sentai Kyoryuger.

Biography
In 2009, Saito passed an audition Hua Hua and music information program of Kumamotokenminterebi Rocket Complex is Sony Music Artists, an entertainment industry.

In 2010, he played as Hanabusa in Fumi Yoshinaga's film Ooku. In 2011, Saito appeared in the NHK Taiga Drama, Gō as Hashiba Hidekatsu. In September of the same year, he appeared in the BeeTV romantic comedy, Ren'ai taikan dorama `kaikan sutoroberī 〜 himi no Hanazono 〜''' as Yukimizunoe Korisaki. In October of the same year, Saito made regular appearances as Takuya Ozawa as in the NTV drama, Kaseifu no Mita, starring Nanako Matsushima. In November of the same year, he appeared in the music information program of Kumamotokenminterebi Rocket Complex served as an MC.

In February 17, 2013, Saito appeared in Zyuden Sentai Kyoryuger as Ian Yorkland/Kyoryu Black.

In February 2015, his major debut from the mini album Party!'' from Nippon Columbia was scheduled.

In 2019, Saito appeared in Kamen Rider Zi-O the Movie: Over Quartzer as Jogen/Kamen Rider Zamonas.

Filmography

TV series

Films

References

External links
  
 Official agency profile 
 Syuusuke Saito at Nippon Columbia 
 

1993 births
Living people
People from Kumamoto
21st-century Japanese male actors
Musicians from Kumamoto Prefecture
21st-century Japanese singers
21st-century Japanese male singers